Drimane is a bicyclic sesquiterpene. It is the parent structure of many natural products with various biological activity.

Among the notable drimanes are:
Polygodial, found in several different plants
Multiple compounds found in several members of the family Canellaceae

References 

Sesquiterpenes